Siwan constituency may refer to
 Siwan (Lok Sabha constituency), a parliamentary (Lok Sabha) constituency in Bihar, India.
 Siwan (Vidhan Sabha constituency), a state legislative assembly constituency in Bihar, India.